Ron Aldridge may refer to:
 Ron Aldridge (field hockey) (born 1933), Canadian field hockey player
 Ron Aldridge (politician) (born 1950), member of the Mississippi House of Representatives